Custer County High School is a public high school located in Westcliffe, Colorado, United States.

Custer County School District is nestled between the Wet Mountains and Sangre de Cristo Mountains of south central Colorado. It includes the neighboring towns of Silver Cliff and Westcliffe, with a county-wide population of 3,500.  All students are in the same building but have three sections within the school.

There are 182 students enrolled in Custer County High School and 527  in the district.

The school operates Monday to Thursday, from 8am to 4pm.

The average class size at the school is 13.

References

Public high schools in Colorado
Schools in Custer County, Colorado